Coral snakes are a large group of elapid snakes that can be divided into two distinct groups, the Old World coral snakes and New World coral snakes. There are 16 species of Old World coral snakes, in three genera (Calliophis, Hemibungarus, and Sinomicrurus), and over 65 recognized species of New World coral snakes, in two genera (Micruroides and Micrurus). Genetic studies have found that the most basal lineages have origins in Asia, suggesting that the group originated in the Old World. While new world species of both genera are venomous, their bites are seldom lethal; only two confirmed fatalities have been documented in the past 100 years from the genus Micrurus. Meanwhile, snakes of the genus Micruroides have never caused a medically-significant bite.

North American coloration patterns
Experts now recognize that certain coloration patterns and common mnemonics - such as the phrase “Red touch yellow, kill a fellow; red touch black, friend of Jack,” which people sometimes use to distinguish between the venomous coral snake & non-venomous milksnake - are not consistent enough to be trustworthy. While any snake exhibiting the coral snake's color  and/or banding pattern in the southeastern United States will almost certainly, in fact, be a coral snake, there are coral snakes in other parts of the world which are colored differently.

Coral snakes in the United States are most notable for their red, yellow/white, and black-colored banding. However, several nonvenomous species in the U.S. have similar (though not identical) bandings, including the two scarlet snake species in the genus Cemophora, and some of the kingsnakes (including the aforementioned milksnakes) in the genus Lampropeltis. However, in reference to the mnemonic phrase “red touching yellow, a deadly fellow,” some of these kingsnakes do not naturally display any red touching yellow, to begin with. Additionally, some ground snakes in the genus Sonora (of the southwestern U.S.)  can have a color pattern that matches that of the sympatric  Sonoran coral snake (Micruroides euryxanthus). No genuine coral snake in the U.S. exhibits red bands of color, in contact with bands of black, except in rare cases of an aberrant pattern. Thus, while on extremely rare occasions when a certain non-venomous snake might be mistaken for a coral snake, the mnemonic holds true. However, a red–yellow–black banded snake in the U.S. (whose red and black banding actually touch) is rarely a venomous coral snake. 

Furthermore, the mnemonic is not consistently accurate for North American coral snake species found south of the U.S., either. Some species, like Mexico’s Oaxacan coral snake (Micrurus ephippifer) or Clark's coral snake (Micrurus clarki, of Costa Rica & Panama), do actually fit the mnemonic; others, like the Mexican saddled coral snake (Micrurus bernadi), the Honduran Roatan coral snake (Micrurus ruatanus), or the redtail coral snake (Micrurus mipartitus) of Panama, do not.  Further still, some South American coral snakes will fit the mnemonic, while others do not. To complicate the issue more, the South American tricolored hognose snake (Xenodon pulcher) has repeated bands of red-black-white-black, imitating the coral snake as a defense mechanism, with the key visual difference being their upturned snout (used for burrowing). The hognoses are, actually, mildly rear-fanged venomous; although generally not considered  serious to humans, anecdotal research has suggested the South American hognoses to possess slightly more potent venom than the North American hognoses. In the Old World, none of the coral snake species usually fit the mnemonic.

Most species of coral snake are small in size. Some coral snakes even live in the water but most of them do not. Aquatic species have flattened tails that act as fins, aiding in swimming.

Behavior

Coral snakes vary widely in their behavior, but most are very elusive, fossorial (burrowing) snakes which spend most of their time buried beneath the ground or in the leaf litter of a rainforest floor, coming to the surface only when it rains or during breeding season. Some species, like Micrurus surinamensis, are almost entirely aquatic and spend most of their lives in slow-moving bodies of water that have dense vegetation.

Coral snakes feed mostly on smaller snakes, lizards, frogs, nestling birds, small rodents, etc.

Like all elapid snakes, coral snakes possess a pair of small hollow fangs to deliver their venom. The fangs are positioned at the front of the mouth. The fangs are fixed in position rather than retractable, and rather than being directly connected to the venom duct, they have a small groove through which the venom enters the base of the fangs. Because the fangs are relatively small and inefficient for venom delivery, rather than biting quickly and letting go (like vipers), coral snakes tend to hold onto their prey and make chewing motions when biting. The venom takes time to reach full effect.

Coral snakes are not aggressive or prone to biting and account for less than one percent of the total number of snake bites each year in the United States. The life span of coral snakes in captivity is about seven years.

Reproduction 
M. fluvius reproduction is internal fertilization through the use of hemipenes. The breeding season occurs from spring to early summer and late summer to early fall. Male combat is not typical in M. fulvius as males are smaller than females. Micrurus fulvius are oviparous and typically lay eggs from May to July. During early spring females will undergo sudden vitellogenesis–oocyte and yolk formation–in preparation for breeding. Approximately 37 days post fertilization oviposition occurs and the average clutch size ranges from five to seven eggs. The incubation period of the M. fluvius eggs normally reaches 60 days. Males also undergo sexual changes throughout the year, testicular recrudescence start in the fall and testicular regression occurs come spring. However, males typically have mature sperm residing in the epididymis year round and are capable of storing sperm in the deferent duct over the winter till the females are receptive. A study investigating how climate influences the reproductive cycle discovered species found closer to the equator displayed more continuous cycles while those in colder regions had more seasonal cycles. With increasing temperatures as a result of climate change, continuous cycles have the possibility of becoming more prevalent. Offspring reach maturation depending on sex, males mature at roughly 11 to 16 months while females reach maturity later at 26 months. With increasing temperatures as a result of climate change continuous cycles have the possibility of becoming more prevalent.

Distribution (U.S.) 

New World coral snakes exist in the southern range of many temperate U.S. states. Coral snakes are found in scattered localities in the southern coastal plains from North Carolina to Louisiana, including all of Florida. They can be found in pine and scrub oak sandhill habitats in parts of this range, but sometimes inhabit hardwood areas and pine flatwoods that undergo seasonal flooding.

There is controversy about the classification of the very similar Texas coral snake as a separate species. Its habitat, in Texas, Louisiana, and Arkansas is separated from the eastern coral snake's habitat by the Mississippi River. The coral snake population is most dense in the southeastern United States, but coral snakes have been documented as far north as Kentucky.

The Arizona coral snake is classified as a separate species and genus and is found in central and southern Arizona, extreme southwestern New Mexico and southward to Sinaloa in western Mexico. It occupies arid and semiarid regions in many different habitat types, including thornscrub, desert-scrub, woodland, grassland and farmland.

Danger to humans
New World coral snakes possess one of the most potent venoms of any North American snake. However, relatively few bites are recorded due to their reclusive nature and the fact they generally inhabit sparsely populated areas. Even in areas that are densely populated bites are rare.  According to the American National Institutes of Health, there are an average of 15–25 coral snake bites in the United States each year. 
When confronted by humans, coral snakes will almost always attempt to flee, and bite only if restrained. In addition, coral snakes have short fangs (proteroglyph dentition) that cannot penetrate thick clothing although bites are possible through normal thin clothing.  Any skin penetration, however, is a medical emergency that requires immediate attention.

Historically, the venom of the North American Micrurus and Micruroides species was believed to contain powerful neurotoxins which could paralyze the breathing muscles, requiring mechanical or artificial respiration.  It was usually reported that there was only mild pain associated with a bite and that respiratory failure could occur within hours.  However recent studies on the bites of at least the Texas Coralsnake (Micrurus tener) have shown that these bites rarely require antivenom, don't usually show any systemic respiratory problems and can be intensely painful.  Further studies are necessary to see if these clinical features are true of all Micrurus species.

Shortages of coral snake antivenin were previously reported, but one source states that production has resumed and,  Pfizer indicates that antivenin is available.

Old World

Genus Calliophis
Species in this genus are:
Calliophis beddomei (M.A. Smith, 1943) – Beddome's coral snake (India)
Calliophis bibroni (Jan, 1858) – Bibron's coral snake (India)
Calliophis bivirgatus (F. Boie, 1827) – blue Malaysian coral snake (Indonesia, Cambodia, Malaysia, Singapore, Thailand)
Calliophis castoe (E.N. Smith, Ogale, Deepak & Giri, 2012) – Castoe's coral snake (India)
Calliophis gracilis (Gray, 1835) – spotted coral snake (Thailand, Malaysia, Indonesia, Singapore)
Calliophis haematoetron (E.N. Smith, Manamendra-Arachchi & Somweera, 2008) – blood-bellied coral snake (Sri Lanka)
Calliophis intestinalis (Laurenti, 1768) – banded Malaysian coral snake (Indonesia, Malaysia)
Calliophis maculiceps (Günther, 1858) – speckled coral snake (Myanmar, Thailand, Malaysia, Vietnam, Cambodia, Laos)
Calliophis melanurus (Shaw, 1802) – Indian coral snake (India, Bangladesh, Sri Lanka)
Calliophis nigrescens (Günther, 1862) – black coral snake (India)
Calliophis salitan (Brown, Smart, Leviton & Smith, 2018) – Dinagat Island Banded Coralsnake (Philippines)

Genus Hemibungarus
Species in this genus are:
Hemibungarus calligaster (Wiegmann, 1835) – barred coral snake (Philippines)
Hemibungarus gemianulis (Peters, 1872) – (Philippines)

Genus Sinomicrurus

Species in this genus are:
Sinomicrurus hatori (Takahashi, 1930) (Taiwan)
Sinomicrurus japonicus (Günther, 1868) – Japanese coral snake (Ryukyu Islands)
Sinomicrurus kelloggi (Pope, 1928) – Kellogg's coral snake (Vietnam, Laos, China)
Sinomicrurus macclellandi (J.T. Reinhardt, 1844) – Macclelland's coral snake (India, Nepal, Myanmar, Thailand, Vietnam, China, Ryukyu Islands, Taiwan)
Sinomicrurus sauteri (Steindachner, 1913) (Taiwan)

New World

Genus Micruroides
Micruroides euryxanthus (Kennicott, 1860) – Arizona coral snake (lowland regions from Arizona to Sinaloa, Mexico)
Micruroides euryxanthus australis (Zweifel & Norris, 1955)
Micruroides euryxanthus euryxanthus (Kennicott, 1860)
Micruroides euryxanthus neglectus (Roze, 1967)

Genus Micrurus
Micrurus albicinctus (Amaral, 1925) – White-banded Coral Snake
Micrurus alleni (K.P. Schmidt, 1936) – Allen's coral snake (eastern Nicaragua, Costa Rica, and Panama)
Micrurus alleni alleni (K.P. Schmidt, 1936)
Micrurus alleni richardi (Taylor, 1951)
Micrurus alleni yatesi (Taylor, 1954)
Micrurus altirostris (Cope, 1860) (Brazil, Uruguay, and northeastern Argentina)
Micrurus ancoralis (Jan, 1872) – regal coral snake (southeastern Panama, western Colombia, and western Ecuador)
Micrurus ancoralis ancoralis (Jan 1872)
Micrurus ancoralis jani (K.P. Schmidt, 1936)
Micrurus annellatus (W. Peters, 1871) – annellated coral snake (southeastern Ecuador, eastern Peru, Bolivia, and western Brazil)
Micrurus annellatus annellatus (W. Peters, 1871)
Micrurus annellatus balzanii (Boulenger, 1898)
Micrurus annellatus bolivianus (Roze, 1967)
Micrurus averyi (K.P. Schmidt, 1939) – black-headed coral snake
Micrurus baliocoryphus (Cope, 1860) – Mesopotamian coral snake
Micrurus bernadi (Cope, 1887) (Mexico)
Micrurus bocourti (Jan 1872) – Ecuadorian coral snake (western Ecuador to northern Colombia)
Micrurus bogerti (Roze, 1967) – Bogert's coral snake (Oaxaca)
Micrurus boicora (Bernarde, Turci, Abegg & Franco, 2018) – Boicora Coral Snake
Micrurus brasiliensis (Roze, 1967) – Brazilian short-tailed coral snake
Micrurus browni (K.P. Schmidt & H.M. Smith, 1943) – Brown's coral snake (Quintana Roo to Honduras)
Micrurus browni browni (K.P. Schmidt & H.M. Smith, 1943)
Micrurus browni importunus (Roze, 1967)
Micrurus browni taylori (K.P. Schmidt & H.M. Smith, 1943)
Micrurus camilae (Renjifo & Lundberg, 2003) (Colombia)
Micrurus catamayensis (Roze, 1989) – Catamayo coral snake (Catamayo Valley of Ecuador)
Micrurus clarki (K.P. Schmidt, 1936) – Clark's coral snake (southeastern Costa Rica to western Colombia)
Micrurus collaris (Schlegel, 1837) – Guyana blackback coral snake (northern South America)
 Micrurus collaris collaris (Schlegel, 1837)
 Micrurus collaris breviventris (Roze & Bernal-Carlo, 1987)
Micrurus corallinus (Merrem, 1820) – painted coral snake
Micrurus decoratus (Jan 1858) – Brazilian coral snake
Micrurus diana (Roze, 1983)
Micrurus diastema (A.M.C. Duméril, Bibron & A.H.A. Duméril, 1854) – variable coral snake
Micrurus diastema aglaeope (Cope, 1859)
Micrurus diastema alienus (F. Werner, 1903)
Micrurus diastema affinis (Jan 1858)
Micrurus diastema apiatus (Jan 1858)
Micrurus diastema diastema (A.M.C. Duméril, Bibron & A.H.A. Duméril, 1854)
Micrurus diastema macdougalli (Roze, 1967)
Micrurus diastema sapperi (F. Werner, 1903)
Micrurus dissoleucus (Cope, 1860) – pygmy coral snake
Micrurus dissoleucus dissoleucus (Cope, 1860)
Micrurus dissoleucus dunni (Barbour, 1923)
Micrurus dissoleucus melanogenys (Cope, 1860)
Micrurus dissoleucus meridensis (Roze, 1989)
Micrurus dissoleucus nigrirostris (K.P. Schmidt, 1955)
Micrurus distans (Kennicott, 1860) – West Mexican coral snake
Micrurus distans distans (Kennicott, 1860)
Micrurus distans michoacanensis (Dugės, 1891)
Micrurus distans oliveri (Roze, 1967)
Micrurus distans zweifeli (Roze, 1967)
Micrurus diutius (Burgur, 1955) – Trinidad Ribbon Coral Snake
Micrurus dumerilii (Jan 1858)
Micrurus dumerilii antioquiensis (K.P. Schmidt, 1936)
Micrurus dumerilii carinicaudus (K.P. Schmidt, 1936)
Micrurus dumerilii colombianus (Griffin, 1916)
Micrurus dumerilii dumerilii (Jan 1858)
Micrurus dumerilii transandinus (K.P. Schmidt, 1936)
Micrurus dumerilii venezuelensis (Roze, 1989)
Micrurus elegans (Jan 1858) – elegant coral snake
Micrurus elegans elegans (Jan 1858)
Micrurus elegans veraepacis (K.P. Schmidt, 1933)
Micrurus ephippifer (Cope, 1886) – Oaxacan coral snake
Micrurus ephippifer ephippifer (Cope, 1886)
Micrurus ephippifer zapotecus (Roze, 1989)
Micrurus filiformis (Günther, 1859) – slender coral snake
Micrurus filiformis filiformis (Günther, 1859)
Micrurus filiformis subtilis (Roze, 1967)
Micrurus frontalis (A.M.C. Duméril, Bibron & A.H.A. Duméril, 1854) – southern coral snake (Brazil to northeastern Argentina)
Micrurus frontalis frontalis (A.M.C. Duméril, Bibron & A.H.A. Duméril, 1854)
Micrurus frontalis mesopotamicus (Barrio & Miranda 19)
Micrurus fulvius (Linnaeus, 1766) – eastern coral snake (U.S. coastal plains of North Carolina to Louisiana)
Micrurus hemprichii (Jan 1858) – Hemprich's coral snake
Micrurus hemprichii hemprichii (Jan 1858)
Micrurus hemprichii ortoni (K.P. Schmidt, 1953)
Micrurus hemprichii rondonianus (Roze & da Silva, 1990)
Micrurus hippocrepis (W. Peters, 1862) – Mayan coral snake
Micrurus ibiboboca (Merrem, 1820) – Caatinga coral snake
Micrurus isozonus (Cope, 1860) – Venezuela coral snake
Micrurus langsdorffi (Wagler, 1824) – Langsdorff's coral snake
Micrurus laticollaris (W. Peters, 1870) – Balsan coral snake
Micrurus laticollaris laticollaris (W. Peters, 1870)
Micrurus laticollaris maculirostris (Roze, 1967)
Micrurus latifasciatus (K.P. Schmidt, 1933) – broad-ringed coral snake
Micrurus lemniscatus (Linnaeus, 1758) – South American coral snake (most of low-lying areas of South America)
Micrurus lemniscatus carvalhoi (Roze, 1967)
Micrurus lemniscatus frontifasciatus (F. Werner, 1927)
Micrurus lemniscatus helleri (K.P. Schmidt & F.J.W. Schmidt, 1925)
Micrurus lemniscatus lemniscatus (Linnaeus, 1758)
Micrurus limbatus (Fraser, 1964) – Tuxtlan coral snake
Micrurus limbatus limbatus (Fraser, 1964)
Micrurus limbatus spilosomus (Pérez-Higaredo & H.M. Smith, 1990)
Micrurus margaritiferus (Roze, 1967) – speckled coral snake
Micrurus medemi (Roze, 1967)
Micrurus meridensis (Roze, 1989) – Merida's coral snake
Micrurus mertensi (K.P. Schmidt, 1936) – Merten's coral snake
Micrurus mipartitus (A.M.C. Duméril, Bibron & A.H.A. Duméril, 1854) – redtail coral snake
Micrurus mipartitus anomalus (Boulenger, 1896)
Micrurus mipartitus decussatus (A.M.C. Duméril, Bibron, & A.H.A. Duméril, 1854)
Micrurus mipartitus mipartitus (A.M.C. Duméril, Bibron & A.H.A. Duméril, 1854)
Micrurus mipartitus semipartitus (Jan 1858)
Micrurus mosquitensis (Schmidt, 1933) – Misquito coral snake
Micrurus multifasciatus (Jan 1858) – many-banded coral snake
Micrurus multifasciatus multifasciatus (Jan 1858)
Micrurus multifasciatus hertwigi (F. Werner, 1897)
Micrurus multiscutatus (Rendahl & Vestergren, 1940) – Cauca coral snake
Micrurus narduccii (Jan, 1863) – Andean blackback coral snake
Micrurus narduccii narduccii (Jan 1863)
Micrurus narduccii melanotus (W. Peters, 1881)
Micrurus nattereri (Schmidt, 1952) – Natterer's Coral Snake
Micrurus nebularis (Roze, 1989) – cloud forest coral snake
Micrurus nigrocinctus (Girard, 1854) – Central American coral snake (Yucatan and Chiapas to Colombia as well as western Caribbean islands)
Micrurus nigrocinctus babaspul (Roze, 1967)
Micrurus nigrocinctus coibensis (K.P. Schmidt, 1936)
Micrurus nigrocinctus divaricatus (Hallowell, 1855)
Micrurus nigrocinctus nigrocinctus (Girard, 1854)
Micrurus nigrocinctus ovandoensis (K.P. Schmidt & H.M. Smith, 1943)
Micrurus nigrocinctus wagneri (Mertens, 1941)
Micrurus nigrocinctus yatesi (Dunn, 1942)
Micrurus nigrocinctus zunilensis (K.P. Schmidt, 1932)
Micrurus obscurus (Jan 1872) – Bolivian Coral Snake
Micrurus oligoanellatus (Ayerbe & Lopez, 2005) – Tambito's Coral Snake
Micrurus ornatissimus (Jan 1858) – Ornate Coral Snake
Micrurus pacaraimae (Morato de Carvalho, 2002)
Micrurus pachecogili (Campbell, 2000)
Micrurus paraensis (da Cunha & Nascimento, 1973)
Micrurus peruvianus (K.P. Schmidt, 1936) – Peruvian coral snake
Micrurus petersi (Roze, 1967) – Peters' coral snake
Micrurus potyguara (Pires, Da Silva, Feitosa, Prudente, Preira-Filho & Zaher, 2014) – Potyguara coral snake
Micrurus proximans (H.M. Smith & Chrapliwy, 1958) – Nayarit coral snake
Micrurus psyches (Daudin, 1803) – Carib coral snake
Micrurus psyches circinalis (A.M.C. Duméril, Bibron & A.H.A. Duméril, 1854)
Micrurus psyches donosoi (Hoge, Cordeiro & Romano, 1976)
Micrurus psyches psyches (Daudin, 1803)
Micrurus putumayensis (Lancini, 1962) – Putumayo coral snake
Micrurus pyrrhocryptus (Cope, 1862)
Micrurus remotus (Roze, 1987)
Micrurus renjifoi (Lamar, 2003)
Micrurus ruatanus (Günther, 1895) – Roatán coral snake
Micrurus sangilensis (Nicéforo-María, 1942) – Santander coral snake
Micrurus scutiventris (Cope, 1869)
Micrurus serranus (Harvey, Aparicio & Gonzalez, 2003)
Micrurus silviae (Di-Bernardo et al., 2007)
Micrurus spixii (Wagler, 1824) – Amazon coral snake
Micrurus spixiii martiusi (K.P. Schmidt, 1953)
Micrurus spixii obscurus (Jan 1872)
Micrurus spixii princeps (Boulenger, 1905)
Micrurus spixii spixii (Wagler, 1824)
Micrurus spurelli (Boulenger, 1914)
Micrurus steindachneri (F. Werner, 1901) – Steindachner's coral snake
Micrurus steindachneri orcesi (Roze, 1967)
Micrurus steindachneri steindachneri (F. Werner, 1901)
Micrurus stewarti (Barbour & Amaral, 1928) - Panamanian coral snake
Micrurus stuarti (Roze, 1967) – Stuart's coral snake
Micrurus surinamensis (Cuvier, 1817) - aquatic coral snake
Micrurus surinamensis nattereri (K.P. Schmidt, 1952)
Micrurus surinamensis surinamensis (Cuvier, 1817)
Micrurus tener (Baird & Girard, 1853) – Texas coral snake (Texas and Louisiana south to Morelos and Guanajuato)
Micrurus tener fitzingeri (Jan 1858)
Micrurus tener maculatus (Roze, 1967)
Micrurus tener microgalbineus (Brown & H.M. Smith, 1942)
Micrurus tener tamaulipensis (Lavin-Murcio & Dixon, 2004)
Micrurus tener tener (Baird & Girard, 1853)
Micrurus tricolor (Hoge, 1956)
Micrurus tikuna (Feitosa, Da Silva Jr, Pires, Zaher & Prudente, 2015)
Micrurus tschudii (Jan 1858) – desert coral snake
Micrurus tschudii olssoni (K.P. Schmidt & F.J.W. Schmidt, 1925)
Micrurus tschudii tschudii (Jan 1858)

Mimicry
New World coral snakes serve as models for their Batesian mimics, false coral snakes, snake species whose venom is less toxic, as well as for many nonvenomous snake species that bear superficial resemblances to them. The role of coral snakes as models for Batesian mimics is supported by research showing that coral snake color patterns deter predators from attacking snake-shaped prey, and that in the absence of coral snakes, species hypothesized to mimic them are indeed attacked more frequently. Species that appear similar to coral snakes include:
Cemophora coccinea
Chionactis palarostris
Erythrolamprus aesculapii
Erythrolamprus bizona
Erythrolamprus ocellatus, Tobago false coral snake
Lampropeltis elapsoides, scarlet kingsnake 
Lampropeltis pyromelana
Lampropeltis triangulum, milk snake, including the following subspecies and others:
Lampropeltis triangulum amaura
Lampropeltis triangulum annulata
Lampropeltis triangulum campbelli
Lampropeltis triangulum gaigeae
Lampropeltis triangulum gentilis
Lampropeltis triangulum hondurensis
Lampropeltis triangulum multistrata
Lampropeltis triangulum syspila
Lampropeltis zonata
Lystrophis pulcher, tri-color hognose snake
Oxyrhopus petola
Oxyrhopus rhombifer, false coral snake
Pliocercus elapoides, variegated false coral snake
Rhinobothryum bovallii, coral mimic snake, false tree coral
Rhinocheilus lecontei tessellatus

References

Further reading
Boulenger, G.A. 1896. Catalogue of the Snakes in the British Museum (Natural History). Volume III., Containing the Colubridæ (Opisthoglyphæ and Proteroglyphæ)... Trustees of the British Museum (Natural History). (Taylor and Francis, Printers.) London. xiv + 727 pp. + Plates I.- XXV. (Elaps, 28 species, pp. 411–433 + Plate XX.)
Roze, J.A. 1996. Coral Snakes of the Americas: Biology, Identification, and Venoms. Krieger. Malabar, Florida. 340 pp. .
 Tanaka G. D., Furtado Md. F. D., Portaro F. C. V., Sant'Anna O. A. & Tambourgi D. V. (2010). "Diversity of Micrurus Snake Species Related to Their Venom Toxic Effects and the Prospective of Antivenom Neutralization". PLoS Neglected Tropical Diseases 4(3): e622. 
 Universidad de Costa Rica (2009). El envenenamiento por mordedura de serpiente en Centroamérica ("Snakebite poisonings in Central America"). San José, Costa Rica: Instituto Clodomiro Picado, Facultad de Microbiología, Universidad de Costa Rica. 

Elapidae
Snake common names
Snake families